The Movement is an American songwriting and record production duo, responsible for writing and producing a series of successful singles, including Jesse McCartney's "Leavin'" and Justin Bieber's "One Time".

Career 
The Los Angeles-based team, consisting of James Bunton and Corron Cole, came together in 2000 and formed The Movement. The duo’s creative chemistry landed The Movement its first major break in 2004 working with Bad Boy Records rapper Mase on the single "Welcome Back". The pair also fielded projects by Lloyd ("Hey Young Girl") and Chingy ("Can't Hate Her"), among other acts between 2004 and 2007.

In 2007, The Movement signed with manager Mark Stewart of the Atlanta-based Red Zone Entertainment, and was recruited to work with Hollywood Records' Jesse McCartney. The result — McCartney’s hit song "Leavin'" from his 2008 Departure album. The Movement went on to write and produce projects for Lionel Richie ("Good Morning"), Pleasure P ("Birthday Suit"), and Marié Digby ("Love With a Stranger"). In 2009, they had a major hit with Justin Bieber's song "One Time".

In 2008, The Movement left Red Zone Entertainment and worked with Jesse McCartney, Jordin Sparks, The Charlies, and Hollywood Records.

Discography

References

External links

Record production duos
Songwriting teams
Songwriters from California